Qaleh-ye Torki (also Romanized as Qal‘eh-ye Torkī) is a village in Cham Rud Rural District, Bagh-e Bahadoran District, Lenjan County, Isfahan Province, Iran. At the 2006 census, its population was 56, in 14 families.

References 

Populated places in Lenjan County